The Bhirombhakdi family is a Thai business family of partial Chinese descent. The family traces its origins to Phraya Bhirombhakdi (personal name Boonrawd Sreshthaputra, 1872–1950), who founded the country's first brewery in 1933. Today, the family continues to own the Boon Rawd Brewery group, best known for its Singha beer, as well as other associated businesses. The family, led by Boonrawd's grandson Santi, is ranked by Forbes as the fourteenth richest person in Thailand as of 2019.

Boonrawd, the family patriarch, had three sons who survived into adulthood: Vidya (a nephew he took as an adopted son); Prachuab (with his second wife Kim); and Chamnong (with his third wife Chimlim). He had three children with his first wife Khunying Lamai, though all died in infancy.

Boonrawd's elder biological son Prachuab succeeded him as head of the business, and became known as Thailand's first brewmaster. Prachuab had five children, of whom two sons, Piya and Santi, became closely involved in the business. They took over after Prachuab's death in 1993, and expanded the business amidst growing competition in the Thai beer industry. Piya later left to establish PB Valley Khao Yai Winery, and Santi became head of the family business. Santi's two sons, Bhurit and Piti are now actively involved in its management.

People
Members of the family include:

Phraya Bhirombhakdi (Boonrawd Sreshthaputra), family patriarch and founder of Boon Rawd Brewery
Vidya Bhirombhakdi, Boonrawd's adopted son
Vudha Bhirombhakdi
Vudtinun Bhirombhakdi
Voravud Bhirombhakdi
Nathawan Teepsuwan
Thanavud Bhirombhakdi
Vapee Bhirombhakdi
Palit Bhirombhakdi
Soravij Bhirombhakdi
Piyajit Osathananda
Pavin Bhirombhakdi
Prachuab Bhirombhakdi, Boonrawd's elder biological son
Piya Bhirombhakdi 
Santi Bhirombhakdi
Bhurit Bhirombhakdi
Piti Bhirombhakdi, married to Woranuch Bhirombhakdi
Preerati Bhirombhakdi
Chamnong Bhirombhakdi, Boonrawd's younger biological son
Chutinant Bhirombhakdi, married to Piyapas Bhirombhakdi
Chitpas Kridakorn
Nantaya Bhirombhakdi
Naiyanobh Bhirombhakdi
Chiranuj Bhirombhakdi

References

 
Business families of Thailand